The Mbugwe are a Bantu ethnic group based in the Babati District of Manyara Region and in south western Arusha Region of Tanzania. The Mbugwe are said to have originated from the Rangi and they speak a language that is related to Rangi. In 1999, the Mbugwe population was estimated to number 24,000. They speak the Mbugwe language.the following are places where mbugwe tribe at Manyara region they are distributed and these are mwada , Magugu, babati etc

References

See also
 Mbugwe language
 Arusha Region
 Manyara Region
 Babati

Ethnic groups in Tanzania
Babati District
Indigenous peoples of Arusha Region
Indigenous peoples of East Africa